The 2019–20 Western Michigan Broncos men's basketball team represented Western Michigan University during the 2019–20 NCAA Division I men's basketball season. The Broncos were led by 17th-year head coach Steve Hawkins, and played their home games at University Arena in Kalamazoo, MI as members of the West Division of the Mid-American Conference. They finished the season 13–19, 6–12 in MAC play to finish in a tie for fifth place in the West Division. They lost in the first round of the MAC tournament to Toledo.

Previous season
The Broncos finished the 2018–19 season 8–24 overall, 2–16 in MAC play to finish in last place in the West Division. As the No. 12 seed in the MAC tournament, they lost in the first round to Central Michigan.

Roster

}

Schedule and results

|-
!colspan=9 style=|Exhibition

|-
!colspan=9 style=|Non-conference regular season

|-
!colspan=9 style=| MAC regular season

|-
!colspan=9 style=| MAC tournament

Source:

References

Western Michigan
Western Michigan Broncos men's basketball seasons
Western Michigan Broncos men's basketball
Western Michigan Broncos men's basketball